Ritchie is an unincorporated community in Knott County, in the U.S. state of Kentucky.

History
A post office was established at Ritchie in 1900, and remained in operation until 1974. Abbie Ritchie was the first postmaster.

References

Unincorporated communities in Knott County, Kentucky
Unincorporated communities in Kentucky